Willy Foster (April 20, 1922 – November 25, 1987), known as Little Willy Foster (or Little Willie Foster), was an American Chicago blues harmonicist, singer, and songwriter.

Biography
Foster was born in Dublin, Mississippi, to Major Foster and Rosie Brown. He was raised on a plantation about ten miles south of Clarksdale. His mother died when he was aged five, and he was raised by his father, who was a local musician. Willy worked the fields from an early age and had little formal education. His father taught him to play the family's piano, and Willy later taught himself to master both the guitar and the harmonica. By 1942, he was working in Clarksdale. Around 1943, he relocated to Chicago. He played the blues around the city and teamed up with Floyd Jones, Lazy Bill Lucas, and his cousin Leroy Foster. Having befriended Big Walter Horton, Foster learned to play the harmonica in Horton's Chicago blues style. Beginning in the mid-1940s, this led to periodic work for Foster on Maxwell Street and in clubs in the city for over a decade. He also worked during this time in a band with Homesick James, Moody Jones and Floyd Jones.

In January 1955, Foster recorded two sides for Parrot Records, his own compositions "Falling Rain Blues" and "Four Day Jump", with accompaniment by Lucas, Jones and Eddie Taylor. Foster reportedly incurred the displeasure of the record label's owner, Al Benson, for reporting him to the American Federation of Musicians for underpaid dues on the recordings. In March 1957, Foster was back in a recording studio in Chicago, where he recorded two more of his songs, "Crying the Blues" and "Little Girl". Regarding the former, AllMusic noted that it "reflected both his emotional singing and his wailing, swooping harmonica".

From this point onwards, his personal life started to degenerate. Attending a house party, Foster was accidentally shot in the head by a woman playing with a handgun. The shooting caused partial paralysis and severely affected his ability to speak. He made a slow recovery but rarely played in public thereafter. In January 1974, Foster voluntarily surrendered himself to the local police after he shot and killed his roommate. Pleading self-defense and impairment of judgement due to his brain injury, he was found not guilty by reason of insanity and was sent to a state hospital in 1975.

Foster died of kidney cancer in the Illinois Insane Asylum in Chicago on November 25, 1987, aged 65.

His four released recordings are available on numerous compilation albums, issued both before and after his death.

Confusion
The variant spelling of his first name is due to the different spellings on his two singles.

He is not to be confused with another blues harmonica player, Willie James Foster (September 19, 1921 or 1922 – May 20, 2001).

Singles discography

See also
List of Chicago blues musicians

Notes

References

1922 births
1987 deaths
American blues harmonica players
American blues singers
20th-century African-American male singers
Songwriters from Mississippi
Chicago blues musicians
People from Dublin, Mississippi
Musicians from Clarksdale, Mississippi
Deaths from cancer in Illinois
20th-century American singers
Songwriters from Illinois
20th-century American male singers
Cobra Records artists
African-American songwriters
American male songwriters